Three ships of the United States Navy have been named Bancroft in honor of George Bancroft.

 , was a gunboat, launched in 1892, commissioned in 1893 and decommissioned in 1906.
 , was a Clemson-class destroyer, commissioned in 1919 and transferred to the Royal Canadian Navy as HMCS St. Francis.
 , was a Benson-class destroyer commissioned in 1942 and decommissioned in 1946.

See also

Sources
 

United States Navy ship names